SN 2020oi was a supernova event in the grand design spiral galaxy known as Messier 100, or NGC 4321. It was discovered January 7, 2020 at an apparent magnitude of 17.28 by F. Forster and associates using the Zwicky Transient Facility. The supernova was not detected on an observation made three days before the discovery, and thus it must have begun during that brief period. The light curve peaked around January 13–18, depending on the wavelength, then declined rapidly over a period of 25 days before flattening into a more gradual decline. Observations of the spectrum made with the SOAR telescope showed this to be a type Ic supernova, with the progenitor being a massive star that had its outer envelope stripped.

It was a member of a binary star system and lost its outer envelope of hydrogen and helium due to interaction with its companion. The supernova explosion was the result of a collapse of an inert iron core.

This is one of the few type Ic supernovae for which radio emission has been detected. Based on this data, the shock wave from the explosion advanced through the surrounding interstellar matter with a velocity of 3−. Images of the location taken prior to the event using the Hubble Space Telescope show a stellar cluster at that location.

References

Further reading

</ref>

Supernovae
Messier 100
Coma Berenices
Astronomical objects discovered in 2020